Anthony Parnther is an American conductor, bassoonist, and educator.

In 2019 he was appointed music director and conductor of the San Bernardino Symphony Orchestra in San Bernardino, California. He is also the music director of the Southeast Symphony in Los Angeles, California, a position he has held since 2010.

He is a prolific conductor of scoring sessions for motion picture, television, album, and video game scores with the Hollywood Studio Symphony.

Early life and family 
Anthony Parnther was born in Norfolk, Virginia, to Samalauluoloitefu (née Paese), an economist and professor, and George Parnther, an engineer.

Around 1949, George Parnther emigrated to the United States from Kingston, Jamaica and enlisted in the U.S. Navy before serving in the Korean War. George eventually matriculated from the Massachusetts Institute of Technology with degrees in engineering and mathematics. Samalaulu (abbreviated) emigrated from Samoa in 1960 and studied economics at Columbia University. The Parnther family settled in Norfolk, Virginia in the late 1960s.

Anthony is a graduate of E.C. Glass High School in Lynchburg, Virginia, where he played the cello, bassoon, and tuba in the instrumental music department.

Education 
He studied conducting at Yale University, music performance at Northwestern University, and education at East Tennessee State University.

He studied conducting with Victor Yampolsky at Northwestern University, Lawrence Leighton Smith and Otto Werner Mueller at Yale University, and Thomas Jenrette and Roxanne Haskill at East Tennessee State University.

Career 
After a two-year international search, the San Bernardino Symphony appointed Anthony Parnther as their Music Director in May 2019.

Parnther currently serves as conductor of the Southeast Symphony in Los Angeles, California and Wind Orchestra of the West. He regularly appears as Cover/Assistant Conductor of the Hollywood Bowl Orchestra.

Previously, he conducted the Orange County Symphony in Anaheim, California and the Inland Valley Symphony (now the Temecula Valley Symphony) in Temecula, California.

He is a noted conductor, orchestrator, and bassoonist with the Hollywood Studio Symphony for television, motion pictures and video games.

Teaching 
Anthony directed the Symphonic Band and directed and designed for the Marching Buccaneers as well as the Men and Women's Basketball Pep Bands at East Tennessee State University from 2004-2007. He taught applied double reeds at Fullerton College from 2008–2010 and served as director of the YMP/YMCO program under the Department of Equity and Inclusion at University of California, Berkeley from 2010–2015. He was Artist-in-residence at the Oakwood School in North Hollywood from 2015–2017.

References

External links

Southeast Symphony opens 64th Season with new Maestro
Biography on Southeast Symphony Website
Theartsdesk.com

21st-century American conductors (music)
African-American classical musicians
African-American conductors (music)
American male conductors (music)
Classical musicians from Virginia
American classical bassoonists
Living people
Musicians from Norfolk, Virginia
People from Temecula, California
21st-century American male musicians
1981 births
20th-century American conductors (music)
20th-century American male musicians
Classical musicians from California
American musicians of Jamaican descent
American people of Samoan descent
20th-century African-American musicians
21st-century African-American musicians